Alfred Wäger (17 August 1883 – 9 July 1956) was a General of the Infantry  in the Wehrmacht of Nazi Germany during the Second World War who commanded several units. He was a recipient of the Knight's Cross of the Iron Cross.

Career 
After the beginning of the Second World War, Wäger was the commanding general of the XXV Army Corps. From 6 November 1939 to 23 December 1941, he led the XXVII Army Corps in the West. Finally, he commanded the Höheres Kommando z.b.V. XXXIV on the central section of the Eastern Front, which was defeated in the Battle of Moscow. He was transferred to the Führerreserve in early January 1942 and finally retired in August 1942.

Wäger settled in Baden-Baden and in the last days of the war was able to hand over the city to the advancing French without a fight. A bridge over the Oos river was named after him in 1995.

Sources
 Alfred Wäger on lexikon-der-wehrmacht
 Armed conflicts

1883 births
1956 deaths
People from Bamberg
Generals of Infantry (Wehrmacht)
German Army personnel of World War I
German Army generals of World War II
Reichswehr personnel
Recipients of the Knight's Cross of the Iron Cross
Military personnel from Bavaria